Alan Shepherd (29 September 1912 – 9 October 1998) was an Australian cricketer. He played in twelve first-class matches for South Australia between 1931 and 1935.

See also
 List of South Australian representative cricketers

References

External links
 

1912 births
1998 deaths
Australian cricketers
South Australia cricketers
Cricketers from Adelaide